This is a list of animated television series that first aired in 1982.

See also
 List of animated feature films of 1982
 List of Japanese animation television series of 1982

References

Television series
Animated series
1982
1982
1982-related lists